Blackwater Draw is an intermittent stream channel about  long, with headwaters in Roosevelt County, New Mexico, about  southwest of Clovis, New Mexico, and flows southeastward across the Llano Estacado toward the city of Lubbock, Texas, where it joins Yellow House Draw to form Yellow House Canyon at the head of the North Fork Double Mountain Fork Brazos River.

Archaeology
The Blackwater Draw National Historic Landmark contains an important archaeological site that was first recognized in 1929 by Ridgley Whiteman of Clovis, New Mexico. Blackwater Locality No. 1 (29RV2; LA3324) is the type-site of the Clovis culture.  The first large-scale excavation occurred in 1932, though local residents had been collecting bone and lithic materials for decades.

In the 1960s Frank J. Brolio excavated a camp site just to the northwest of the main site, known colloquially as "Franks Folsom Site". Finds included an especially large chert bi-face. In this period (1952 to 1970) Blackwater Draw was being commercially mined for gravel with a number of mammoth and bison kill stations being uncovered.

In another part of Blackwater draw known as the Mitchell Locality a large Folsom period campsite was excavated in the 1980s. A number of lithics were recovered including some with bison and pronghorn blood residue.

Evidence of "fluted" points, spearheads now known as Clovis points (a New World invention) and other stone and bone weapons, tools, and processing implements were found at the archaeological site. The Clovis points were lanceolate and often, though not always, longer than Folsom points.

The Clovis-age artifacts are in association with the remains of extinct Late Pleistocene megafauna, including mammoth, camel, horse, bison, saber-toothed cat, sloths, and dire wolf that were hunted by the early peoples who visited the site. Generations of some of the earliest New World inhabitants hunted and camped at Blackwater Draw, creating stratified levels of archaeological remains from many different time periods, including Clovis, Folsom, Midland, Agate Basin, and various Archaic period occupants.

Clovis chipped stone technology is currently one of the oldest and most widespread chipped stone technologies recognized in the New World; radiocarbon dates on sediment from the Clovis layers at Blackwater Draw average around 11,290 years before the present.  Two of the projectile points from Blackwater Draw were used as the type specimens to define Clovis chipped stone technology in the 1930s.

The archaeological site is known for its well-defined and dated stratigraphic horizons that exhibit numerous cultural sequences.  The sequences begin with the some of the earlier New World peoples and continue through the southwestern archaic, and into the historic period. Investigations at Blackwater Draw have recovered protein residue on Clovis weapons, indicating their use as hunting and possibly butchering tools on extinct Pleistocene animals.

Towards the end of the Pleistocene period, the climate began to change, which brought warmer and drier weather, causing the water flow in the region to dramatically decrease. This decrease caused small seasonal lake basins called playas to form. These areas became popular hunting locations for early North Americans. In that period the site had a number of active springs. A number of lithics were found in the sandy spring drains. The usual assumption is that they were discarded into the springs though it has been suggested there was a ritual component.

Since its discovery, the Blackwater Locality No. 1 site has been a focal point for scientific investigations by academic institutions and organizations from across the country. The Carnegie Institute, Smithsonian Institution, Academy of Natural Sciences, National Science Foundation, United States National Museum, National Geographic Society, and more than a dozen major universities either have funded or participated in research at Blackwater Draw. Eastern New Mexico University owns and manages the excavations and visitations at the site.

The  Anderson Basin district around Blackwater Draw in Roosevelt County, near Clovis and Portales was declared a National Historic Landmark in 1961 and incorporated into the National Register of Historic Places in 1966.

Blackwater Draw Museum

The original Blackwater Draw Museum was first opened to the public in 1969, at 42987 Highway 70, Portales, New Mexico primarily to display artifacts uncovered at the Blackwater Locality No. 1 site. The artifacts and displays illustrated life at the site during the Clovis period (over 13,000 years ago) through the recent historic period. 

In 2017, the museum moved onto the Eastern New Mexico University (ENMU) campus, and expanded its focus to incorporate local history, as well as archaeology on a broad scale. Exhibits now include descriptions of archaeological work, different archaeological sites, cultural complexes, and scientific methods, among other topics. Visitors can learn more information about Blackwater Draw, archaeology, and see materials from the greater Southwest obtained from private collections. Currently, the Miles Collection displays Southwestern pottery, basketry, and textiles. As of August 2017, Blackwater Draw is under the direction of Dr. Brendon Asher of ENMU in Portales. The museum hired its first Collections Manager in 2020, Samantha Bomkamp. 

The museum and site operate under the supervision of the Eastern New Mexico University's Department of Anthropology and Applied Archaeology. ENMU students are able to work at the museum and site as student employees, interns, or volunteers. Anthropology students regularly use museum collections for class projects, research, and master's theses. Both facilities host class visits from ENMU and K-12 year round.

See also

Blanco Canyon
Blancan
Brazos River
Clovis point
Llano Estacado
Lubbock Lake Landmark
Lubbock Subpluvial
Mount Blanco
North Fork Double Mountain Fork Brazos River
Yellow House Draw

References

Further reading
Agogino, George A., et al., "BLACKWATER DRAW LOCALITY NO. 1, SOUTH BANK: REPORT FOR THE SUMMER OF 1974", Plains Anthropologist, vol. 21, no. 73, pp. 213–23, 1976
Boldurian, Anthony T., and Susanne M. Hubinsky, "PREFORMS IN FOLSOM LITHIC TECHNOLOGY: A VIEW FROM BLACKWATER DRAW, NEW MEXICO", Plains Anthropologist, vol. 39, no. 150, pp. 445–464, 1994
Broilo, F.J., "An Investigation of Surface Collected Clovis, Folsom, and Midland Projectile Points from Blackwater Draw and Adjacent Localities", Master's thesis, Department of Anthropology, Eastern New Mexico University, Portales, 1971
Hester, J. J., "Blackwater Locality No. 1. A Stratified Early Man Site in Eastern New Mexico, with Selections by E. L. Lundelius, Jr. and R. Fryxell" Publication of the Fort Burgwin Research Center, No. 8. Southern Methodist University, 1972
Patrick, R., "The Occurrence of Flints and Extinct Animals in Pluvial Deposits Near Clovis, New Mexico, Part V- Diatom Evidence from the Gravel Pit", Proceedings Philadelphia academy of Natural Sciences 90, pp. 15-24, 1938
Saunders, Jeffrey J., et al., "A Mammoth-Ivory Semifabricate from Blackwater Locality No. 1, New Mexico", American Antiquity, vol. 55, no. 1, pp. 112–119, 1990
Saunders, Jeffrey J., et al., "A Mammoth-Ivory Burnisher-Billet from the Clovis Level, Blackwater Locality No. 1, New Mexico", Plains Anthropologist, vol. 36, no. 137, pp. 359–363, 1991
Seebach, John D., "Stratigraphy and Bonebed Taphonomy at Blackwater Draw Locality No. 1 during the Middle Holocene (Altithermal)", Plains Anthropologist, vol. 47, no. 183, pp. 339–358, 2002
Smith, Shirley, and George Agogino, "A COMPARISON OF WHOLE AND FRAGMENTARY PALEO-INDIAN POINTS FROM BLACKWATER DRAW", Plains Anthropologist, vol. 11, no. 33, pp. 201–03, 1966
Stevens, D., "Blackwater Draw Locality No. 1, 1963-1972, and Its Relevance to the Firstview Complex", Unpublished M A. thesis, Department of Anthropology, Estern New Mexico University, Portales, 1973

External links

Theclovissite.wordpress.com:  Current research at the Blackwater Draw Clovis type site
Blackwater Draw Facebook Page

Clovis sites
Canyons and gorges of New Mexico
Landforms of Roosevelt County, New Mexico
Native American museums in New Mexico
Archaeological museums in New Mexico
Museums in Roosevelt County, New Mexico
University museums in New Mexico
Archaeological type sites
Archaeological sites on the National Register of Historic Places in New Mexico
Pre-Columbian archaeological sites
Historic districts on the National Register of Historic Places in New Mexico
History of Roosevelt County, New Mexico
National Historic Landmarks in New Mexico
Native American history of New Mexico
Brazos River
Llano Estacado
National Register of Historic Places in Roosevelt County, New Mexico